Belarus competed in the Summer Olympic Games for the first time as an independent nation at the 1996 Summer Olympics in Atlanta, United States. Previously, Belarusian athletes competed for the Unified Team at the 1992 Summer Olympics. 157 competitors, 91 men and 66 women, took part in 115 events in 19 sports.

Medalists

Archery

In its debut Olympic archery competition, Belarus was represented by two women. Their combined record was 4–2 as Olga Yakusheva made it to the quarterfinals before being defeated.

Athletics

Men
Road events

Field events

Combined events - Decathlon

Women
Track & road events

Field events

Combined events - Heptathlon

Badminton

Boxing

Men

Canoeing

Slalom

Sprint

Cycling

Road

Track

Diving

Men

Women

Fencing

One male fencer represented Belarus in 1996.

Gymnastics

Artistic
Men
Team

Individual finals

Women
Team

Individual finals

Rhythmic
Individual

Group

Judo

Men

Women

Rowing

Men

Women

Sailing

Women

Open

M = Medal race; EL = Eliminated – did not advance into the medal race; CAN = Race cancelled

Shooting

Men

Women

Swimming

Men

Women

Table tennis

Tennis

Women

Weightlifting

Men

Wrestling

Men's freestyle

Men's Greco-Roman

References

External links

Nations at the 1996 Summer Olympics
1996
Olympics